The Laredo International Railway Bridge 2 (also known as Union Pacific International Railway Bridge) is a proposed international rail bridge project that will soon help alleviate traffic congestion on the U.S.-Mexico border between  Laredo, Texas, and Nuevo Laredo, Tamaulipas. A United States Presidential Permit has already been secured for the construction of the second international rail bridge into Tamaulipas. It is to be built by Union Pacific Railway south of the World Trade International Bridge in the Northwest Laredo, Texas and North Nuevo Laredo, Tamaulipas Municipality area.

May 24, 2007 Update 
Texas State Senator Judith Zaffirini got Senate Bill 893 to move forward. The bill amends the Texas Transportation Code to explicitly include Webb County as an entity permitted to build a railroad toll bridge.

May 15, 2008 Update 
Environmental studies performed by Kansas City Southern de México and Union Pacific suggest the railway bridge be built between El Cenizo, Texas and Rio Bravo, Texas south of Laredo and East Nuevo Laredo. When built, the older Texas-Mexican Railway International Bridge will be converted to either a northbound express lane for trailers and buses or a track for passenger trains.

See also 
 Union Pacific International Railroad Bridge (Eagle Pass – Piedras Negras)

Sources 
 Corpus Christi Daily
 Bravo Network
 May 24, 2007 Update

References 

International bridges in Laredo, Texas
Proposed bridges in the United States
Railway bridges in Mexico
Railroad bridges in Texas